David Vandenbossche (born 27 September 1980 in Dunkerque) is a French footballer, who is currently playing for Auxerre B.

Career
Vandenbossche began his career as part of the youth academy at French club AJ Auxerre. He left the club in 2004, to join Ligue 2 side LB Châteauroux on loan for six months, before moving back to Auxerre, later that year, he joined Châteauroux permanently. In 2008, he joined French second tier club US Boulogne and on 31 July 2009 US Boulogne have released striker. On 2 February 2010 FC Lausanne-Sport signed the French and former US Boulogne striker on a free transfer until the end of the season. After a short stay in Switzerland, Vandenbossche moved on to Paris FC for one season before joining the Auxerre reserve team in 2011.

References

External links 
 

Living people
1980 births
French footballers
French expatriate footballers
Ligue 2 players
Ligue 1 players
US Boulogne players
LB Châteauroux players
AJ Auxerre players
FC Lausanne-Sport players
Paris FC players
Expatriate footballers in Switzerland
Association football midfielders
Mediterranean Games bronze medalists for France
Mediterranean Games medalists in football
Competitors at the 2001 Mediterranean Games